The 1982–83 John Player Cup was the 12th edition of England's premier rugby union club competition at the time. Bristol won the competition defeating Leicester in the final. The event was sponsored by John Player cigarettes and the final was held at Twickenham Stadium.

Draw and results

First round

Away team progress*

Second round

Third round

Fourth round

Quarter-finals

Semi-finals

Final

References

1982–83 rugby union tournaments for clubs
1982–83 in English rugby union
RFU Knockout Cup